Hebron Estates is a home rule-class city in Bullitt County, Kentucky, in the United States. The population was 1,087 at the 2010 census.

Geography
Kentucky Route 61 (North Preston Highway) forms the western border of the community.

Demographics

At the 2000 census, there were 1,104 people, 432 households and 326 families residing in the city. The racial makeup of the city was 97.83% White, 0.18% African American, 0.18% Native American, 0.54% Asian, 0.18% from other races, and 1.09% from two or more races.

There were 432 households, of which 27.8% had children under the age of 18 living with them, 68.1% were married couples living together, 4.9% had a female householder with no husband present, and 24.5% were non-families. 19.4% of all households were made up of individuals, and 4.4% had someone living alone who was 65 years of age or older. The average household size was 2.56 and the average family size was 2.96.

Age distribution was 20.2% under the age of 18, 10.1% from 18 to 24, 28.5% from 25 to 44, 32.3% from 45 to 64, and 8.9% who were 65 years of age or older. The median age was 41 years. For every 100 females, there were 98.9 males. For every 100 females age 18 and over, there were 96.7 males.

The median household income $51,146, and the median family income was $59,732. Males had a median income of $40,511 versus $26,875 for females. The per capita income for the city was $22,748. None of the families and 2.0% of the population were living below the poverty line, including no under eighteens and 5.7% of those over 64.

References

Cities in Bullitt County, Kentucky
Cities in Kentucky
Louisville metropolitan area
Populated places established in 1984
1984 establishments in Kentucky